Macrosia chalybeata is a moth of the subfamily Arctiinae. It was described by George Hampson in 1901. It is found in Kenya, Lesotho, Malawi, South Africa and Zimbabwe.

References

 

Lithosiini
Moths described in 1901